"Candidatus Bartonella thailandensis" is a candidatus bacteria from the genus of Bartonella which was isolated in Thailand.

References

   

Bartonellaceae
Bacteria described in 2009
Candidatus taxa